François Xavier Darasse (3 September 1934 – 24 November 1992) was a French organist, musicologist, composer, and pedagogue. The  (Organs of Toulouse) festival organise the International Xavier Darasse Organ Competition every three years in his honour.

He was titular organist of the Basilica of Saint-Sernin in his hometown, Toulouse.

Life 
Darasse was born in Toulouse (Haute-Garonne) into a family of musicians (his mother, Renée-Marie Darasse-Laroyenne, was an organist) in 1964 and is a namesake of Saint Francis Xavier. He was a student of Maurice Duruflé, Rolande Falcinelli, Jean Rivier and Olivier Messiaen at the Conservatoire de Paris. His repertoire extended from early music to contemporary repertoire.

In 1976, after a serious road accident, during which he lost his right arm (which he was successfully transplanted without being able to regain his motor skills), he had to put an end to his career as a concert performer. He then devoted himself to teaching the organ, as well as composition, with among other things "Instants éclatés" in 1983 for the Orchestre national du Capitole de Toulouse.

He was appointed director of the Conservatoire de Paris in 1991, succeeding Alain Louvier.

He died prematurely of cancer in 1992 in Toulouse, leaving an opera adapted from Oscar Wilde's the Picture of Dorian Gray unfinished. Marc-Olivier Dupin succeeded him as the director of the Conservatoire de Paris and Michel Bouvard succeeded him as organist of Saint-Sernin. In his memory, a Toulousain street was renamed to Rue Xavier Darasse.

Musical ideas 
Darasse carried and invented an organological perspective different from that of his contemporaries. He favored the breath (continuous or interrupted), the articulated discourse (the importance of touch and digital articulation), and registers and colours (the heritage of his professor of musical analysis, Olivier Messiaen).

During his short career, Darasse was one of the most eclectic organists of his generation, sensitive as much to early music, whose mysteries he knew, as to contemporary organ music, of which he was one of the great promoters. Darasse had close friendships with Antoine Tisné and Iannis Xenakis, and he gave the French and German premieres of the latter's only organ work Gmeeoorh (1974).

Compositions

Organ 
 Organum I for organ (1970), commission of the Festival de Royan
 Organum II for organ (1978), commission of the CNSM de Paris
 Organum III for organ (1979), commande pour le concours d’orgue de Chartres
 Organum IV for organ and three percussions (1981)
 Organum V for organ (1983), State commission
 Organum VI for organ (1986), a series of 6 short and easy pieces for a classical organ
 Organum VII for soprano and organ (1989), for the Saint-Bertrand-de-Comminges festival
 Organum VIII for organ and brass quintet (1972), commission of the festival de Metz, in memoriam Jean-Pierre Guézec
 Pedal-Exercitium for organ (1988) commission of the Éditions Universal.

Choral 

 Notre Père, in the style of the Messe pour Montserrat for four mixed voices (soprano, alto, tenor, bass)

Opera 

 The Picture of Dorian Gray (1990-1992), libretto by Oscar Wilde - unfinished upon death

References

External links 
 
 Ch-M. Widor by Xavier Darasse at Saint-Sernin de Toulouse (YouTube)

1934 births
1992 deaths
Musicians from Toulouse
French classical organists
French male organists
Conservatoire de Paris alumni
Directors of the Conservatoire de Paris
Academic staff of the Conservatoire de Paris
Deaths from cancer in France
20th-century organists
20th-century French male musicians
French classical composers
French male classical composers
Male classical organists